Robert Smyth McColl (13 April 1876 – 25 November 1959) was a Scottish footballer who played as a centre forward.

Playing career 
McColl started his career with junior club Benmore in 1892 and moved to Queen's Park in 1894. He represented the Scottish League in 1901. He later played professionally in England for Newcastle United, remaining on Tyneside for three years until he came back to Glasgow in 1904 to play for Rangers. He returned to Queen's Park in 1907, although the restoration of his amateur status had to be decided by the board of the club beforehand. McColl finished his football career in 1912, scoring 6 goals in his penultimate game against Port Glasgow Athletic, a Scottish scoring record which stands to the present day.

McColl played 13 games and scored 13 goals for the Scotland national football team and he was inducted into the Scottish Football Hall of Fame in November 2011. He is the only player to have scored a hat-trick against each of the other home nations.

Personal life 
McColl is now better known for lending his name to the newsagent chain RS McColl, which he set up in 1901 with his brother Tom; due to this he became known as 'Toffee Bob'. He served as a sergeant in the Royal Army Service Corps during the First World War. He is buried at Cathcart Cemetery in southern Glasgow.

Career statistics

International 

Scores and results list Scotland's goal tally first, score column indicates score after each McColl goal.

See also 
 List of Scotland national football team hat-tricks

References

External links 
 Glasgow Evening Times article with mention of Robert Smyth McColl
 The Guardian article with mention of RS McColl

1876 births
Scottish footballers
Scotland international footballers
Rangers F.C. players
Newcastle United F.C. players
Queen's Park F.C. players
1959 deaths
Association football forwards
Scottish Football Hall of Fame inductees
Scottish Football League players
Scottish Football League representative players
English Football League players
British Army personnel of World War I
Royal Army Service Corps soldiers
Footballers from Glasgow
People from Springburn
People educated at Queen's Park Secondary School
Burials at Cathcart Cemetery